Su Yu-hsuan (born 21 February 2001) is a Taiwanese footballer who plays as a forward for the Chinese Taipei women's national team.

International goals

References

2001 births
Living people
Women's association football forwards
Taiwanese women's footballers
Chinese Taipei women's international footballers
Okayama Yunogo Belle players